Underwood-Petersville is a census-designated place (CDP) in Lauderdale County, Alabama United States. It is part of the Florence - Muscle Shoals Metropolitan Statistical Area known as "The Shoals". As of the 2010 census, the population of the CDP is 3,247.

Geography
Underwood-Petersville is located at  (34.872469, -87.692776).

Demographics

As of the census of 2000, there were 3,137 people, 1,295 households, and 953 families residing in the CDP. The racial makeup of the CDP was 94.68% White, 4.11% Black or African American, 0.19% Native American, 0.35% Asian, 0.10% from other races, and 0.57% from two or more races. 0.54% of the population were Hispanic or Latino of any race.

There were 1,295 households, out of which 30.2% had children under the age of 18 living with them, 60.1% were married couples living together, 9.7% had a female householder with no husband present, and 26.4% were non-families. 23.2% of all households were made up of individuals, and 9.3% had someone living alone who was 65 years of age or older. The average household size was 2.42 and the average family size was 2.84.

In the CDP, the population was spread out, with 22.4% under the age of 18, 8.0% from 18 to 24, 28.2% from 25 to 44, 25.7% from 45 to 64, and 15.7% who were 65 years of age or older. The median age was 40 years. For every 100 females, there were 98.4 males. For every 100 females age 18 and over, there were 95.6 males.

The median income for a household in the CDP was $37,159, and the median income for a family was $45,212. Males had a median income of $35,301 versus $21,129 for females. The per capita income for the CDP was $17,461. About 8.4% of families and 12.2% of the population were below the poverty line, including 19.8% of those under age 18 and 9.4% of those age 65 or over.

2010 census
As of the census of 2010, there were 3,247 people, 1,382 households, and 939 families residing in the CDP. The racial makeup of the CDP was 91.3% White, 6.2% Black or African American, 0.2% Native American, 0.6% Asian, 0.4% from other races, and 0.57% from two or more races. 1.0% of the population were Hispanic or Latino of any race.

There were 1,382 households, out of which 26.2% had children under the age of 18 living with them, 49.4% were married couples living together, 14.5% had a female householder with no husband present, and 32.1% were non-families. 28.4% of all households were made up of individuals, and 10.0% had someone living alone who was 65 years of age or older. The average household size was 2.34 and the average family size was 2.86.

In the CDP, the population was spread out, with 22.0% under the age of 18, 9.0% from 18 to 24, 25.1% from 25 to 44, 27.3% from 45 to 64, and 16.7% who were 65 years of age or older. The median age was 40.7 years. For every 100 females, there were 90.9 males. For every 100 females age 18 and over, there were 91.9 males.

The median income for a household in the CDP was $39,774, and the median income for a family was $47,356. Males had a median income of $46,950 versus $29,167 for females. The per capita income for the CDP was $21,534. About 9.4% of families and 11.2% of the population were below the poverty line, including 10.6% of those under age 18 and 1.2% of those age 65 or over.

References

Census-designated places in Lauderdale County, Alabama
Florence–Muscle Shoals metropolitan area
Census-designated places in Alabama